James Hugh Joseph Tate (April 10, 1910 – May 27, 1983) was an American politician. A member of the Democratic Party, he served as the 92nd Mayor of Philadelphia from 1962 to 1972. He was also a member of the Pennsylvania House of Representatives and the Philadelphia City Council. He was the first Roman Catholic to serve as mayor of Philadelphia.

Biography

Early life and career
He was born on April 10, 1910, in Philadelphia. He received his Bachelor of Laws from Temple University in 1938 and clerked for the Philadelphia Court of Common Pleas.

He was active in Democratic Party politics and, in 1941, won a seat in the Pennsylvania House of Representatives to an at-large seat for Philadelphia County. He won re-election to the House in 1943 and 1945. In 1951, he won a seat on the Philadelphia City Council and became the President pro tempore in 1954, which became the council president in 1955. He held that position for nearly 10 years.

Mayor of Philadelphia
Mayor Richardson Dilworth resigned his post in 1962 in order to make a second run for Governor in that fall’s general election. As the city council president, Tate became acting mayor upon Dilworth’s resignation. He went on to win two terms in his own right, in 1963 and 1967. As a result, he is to date the longest serving mayor.

In 1963, he defeated Republican James McDermott with 54% of the vote. He fended off a protest by the Congress of Racial Equality by stopping construction of the Philadelphia Municipal Services Building until more black workers were hired.

In 1967, he appointed Frank Rizzo as the police commissioner. He defeated District Attorney Arlen Specter in 1967 by less than 12,000 votes.

In 1970 and 1971, Tate served as the president of the United States Conference of Mayors.

Later life and death
Towards the end of his life, Tate lived in Longport, New Jersey.

Tate died of an apparent myocardial infarction in Somers Point, aged 73.

References

External links
Description of James H. J. Tate archives at City of Philadelphia website

1910 births
1983 deaths
Mayors of Philadelphia
People from Longport, New Jersey
Philadelphia City Council members
20th-century American politicians
Pennsylvania Democrats
Presidents of the United States Conference of Mayors